Yangus-Narat (Yañğıźnarat) is a rural locality (a village) in Itkineyevsky Selsoviet, Yanaulsky District, Bashkortostan, Russia. The population was 94 as of 2010. There is 1 street.

Geography 
Yangus-Narat is located 12 km south of Yanaul (the district's administrative centre) by road. Susady-Ebalak is the nearest rural locality.

References 

Rural localities in Yanaulsky District